The 2010 European Tour was the second edition of the Race to Dubai and the 39th season of golf tournaments since the European Tour officially began in 1972. 

The season consisted of 47 tournaments, beginning with two events in December 2009 and culminating with the Dubai World Championship the following November. The schedule included the four major championships, four World Golf Championships and the Ryder Cup.

The Race to Dubai was won by Germany's Martin Kaymer. Kaymer and U.S. Open champion Graeme McDowell from Northern Ireland shared the Golfer of the Year award.

Changes for 2010
There were many changes from the 2009 season, including six new tournaments; they were the Africa Open in South Africa, the returning Avantha Masters in India which had been cancelled in 2009, the Trophée Hassan II in Morocco, the Iberdrola Open Cala Millor Mallorca and the Andalucía Valderrama Masters in Spain, and the Vivendi Cup in France. Lost from the schedule were the European Open, the Mercedes-Benz Championship, the Johnnie Walker Classic, the Australian Masters, the Indonesia Open and the Volvo World Match Play Championship. There were also three fewer tournaments due to a partial realignment of the schedule with the calendar.

Schedule
The following table lists official events during the 2010 season.

Unofficial events
The following events were sanctioned by the European Tour, but did not carry official money, nor were wins official.

Location of tournaments

Race to Dubai
Since 2009, the European Tour's money list has been known as the Race to Dubai. It is based on money earned during the season and is calculated in Euro, with earnings from tournaments that award prize money in other currencies being converted at the exchange rate available the week of the event.

Final standings
Final top 15 players in the Race to Dubai:

• Did not play

Awards

Golfer of the Month
The winners of the European Tour Golfer of the Month Award were as follows:

See also
2010 in golf
2010 Challenge Tour
2010 European Senior Tour
2010 PGA Tour
List of golfers with most European Tour wins

Notes

References

External links
2010 season results on the PGA European Tour website
2010 Order of Merit on the PGA European Tour website

European Tour seasons
European Tour